The 1992–93 Football championship of Ukraine among amateurs was the first season of the nationwide amateur competitions in the independent Ukraine and was known as the football competitions of fitness collectives or KFK for short. The tournament was conducted under auspices of the Football Federation of Ukraine before creation of the Ukrainian Football Amateur Association.

Unlike the professional football competitions that started in late February 1992 changing to fall-spring calendar, the amateur competitions started somewhat late due to the same shift in competitions. Beside that factor the format, provided by the Football Federation of Ukrainian SSR, was left unchanged leaving all six groups that were divided by regional principal. There competed total of 82 teams representing all 27 regional football federations.

All group winners (six of them) were allowed to enter the transitional league next season.

Teams

Location map

Composition

Group 1 (Far West)
The group covered the following regions: Lviv Oblast, Zakarpattia Oblast, Volyn Oblast, Ivano-Frankivsk Oblast, Chernivtsi Oblast.

Notes
 The game Pokuttia-Halychyna took place in the village of Zabolotiv.
 Initially games Shakhtar-Lada 0:0 and Sokil-Shakhta 9 3:0 were all changed to -:+.
 The best scorer in group: V.Tsyvchyk (Pidshybnyk Lutsk) - 17.

Group 2 (Near West)
The group covered following regions: Ivano-Frankivsk Oblast, Ternopil Oblast, Rivne Oblast, Khmelnytskyi Oblast, Vinnytsia Oblast, Zhytomyr Oblast.

Notes
 Start and Iskra withdrew in the second half.
 Initially the game Zoria-Khutrovyk 0:0 was changed to -:+.
 The game Shkiryanyk-Sluch was conducted in the village of Myroslavka.
 Lokomotyv Rivne all its games played in Zdolbuniv, therefore in some records it's known as Lokomotyv Zdolbuniv. The games against Podillya Reshutsk (?) and Integral Rivne (?) were conducted in Rivne.
 The best scorer for the group was Serhiy Turyansky (Khutrovyk) - 12.

Group 3 (Center)
The group covered the following regions: Zhytomyr Oblast, Kyiv Oblast, Kyiv-City, Cherkasy Oblast, Chernihiv Oblast, Sumy Oblast.

Notes
 Rotor and Spartak Zolotonosha withdrew in the second half.
 Spartak Okhtyrka played its games in Trostyanets (first half) and Kyrylivka (second half).
 The best scorer in the group P.Nesterchuk (Dynamo-3) - 14.

Group 4 (Near East)
The group covered the following regions: Dnipropetrovsk Oblast, Luhansk Oblast, Poltava Oblast, Donetsk Oblast, Kharkiv Oblast, Kirovohrad Oblast.

Notes
 Initially the game Hirnyk Komsomolsk-Avanhard Rovenky 2:2 was later changed to -:+.
 Polihraftekhnika-2 withdrew during the winter-break.
 The best scorer in the group were Yu.Hatilov (Vuhlyk Donetsk) and Serhiy Chuichenko (Tsementnyk Balaklea) - 14.
 For unknown reasons Azovmash placed ahead of Hirnyk even though even their head-to-head meetings finished in favor of Komsomolsk players.

Group 5 (Far East)
The group covered the following regions: Dnipropetrovsk Oblast, Luhansk Oblast, Donetsk Oblast, Kharkiv Oblast, Zaporizhzhia Oblast.

Notes
 The best scorer: Serhiy Akymenko (Shakhtar Snizhne) - 23. He became the best out of all groups.

Group 6 (South)
The group covered the following regions: Crimea, Kherson Oblast, Odessa Oblast, Mykolaiv Oblast, Dnipropetrovsk Oblast.

Notes
 Surozh Sudak played all its games in Zolote Pole.
 Vodnyk Mykoaliv withdrew during the winter break.
 Initially the games Enerhiya Illichivsk - Olimpiya Yuzhnoukrainsk 3:1, Dnistrovets - Surozh 4:1, and Dnistrovets - Blaho 3:0 later were all changed to -:+.
 The best group scorer: I.Shtykhar (Enerhiya Nova Kakhovka) - 16.

Promotion
To the 1993–94 Ukrainian Transitional League were promoted all six group winners FC Beskyd Nadvirna, FC Khutrovyk Tysmenytsia, FC Hart Borodianka, FC Sirius Zhovti Vody, FC Oskil Kupyansk, FC Surozh Sudak. Beside the winners of amateur competitions to the Transitional League were also admitted other amateur teams passing the tournament.

See also
 Ukrainian Third League 1992–93
 Ukrainian Cup 1992-93

External links
 Results

Ukrainian Football Amateur League seasons
5